The Archbishop of Cardiff is the ordinary of the Roman Catholic Archdiocese of Cardiff.

The metropolitan see is in the city of Cardiff where the archbishop's seat is located at the Metropolitan Cathedral Church of St David.

With the exception of the second archbishop, Francis Mostyn, born in Flintshire and of local descent, the Welsh connections of the archbishops have been extremely weak. Ireland, London and the English provinces have supplied a majority.

The see is currently held by the Most Reverend Mark O'Toole, 8th Archbishop of Cardiff, who was appointed by the Holy See on 27 April 2022 and installed at St David's Cathedral, Cardiff on 20 June 2022.

History
The Vicariate Apostolic of the Welsh District was created out of the Western District of England and Wales in 1840. The Welsh District covered all of the principality of Wales and the English county of Herefordshire. On the restoration of the Catholic hierarchy in England and Wales in 1850, the Welsh District was divided. The southern half became the Diocese of Newport and Menevia and the northern half became part of the Diocese of Shrewsbury. In 1895, the diocese lost territory on the creation of the Vicariate Apostolic of Wales, which became the diocese of Menevia in 1898. As a result, the see changed its name to simply the diocese of Newport. Following further reorganisation of the Catholic Church in Wales in 1916, the diocese of Newport was elevated to an ecclesiastical province and changed its name to the archdiocese of Cardiff. The archbishop has jurisdiction over the bishops of Menevia and Wrexham.

Office holders
The following is a list of the archbishops of the Roman Catholic Archdiocese of Cardiff and its precursor offices.

Vicars Apostolic of the Welsh District

Bishops of Newport and Menevia
In 1895, the episcopal title became simply the Bishop of Newport.

Archbishops of Cardiff

See also
Roman Catholicism in England and Wales

References

Bibliography

 

 
Roman Catholic Archdiocese of Cardiff

de:Erzbistum Cardiff